According to the Gospel of Mark, as Jesus passes through Gennesaret, just after the account of him walking on water, all those who touch the edge, or Hem, or fringe of his cloak are healed:

The same account is given in Matthew 14:34-36.

First-century historian Flavius Josephus refers to the Gennesaret area as having very rich soil. The town was perhaps halfway between Capernaum and Magdala.

This account is seen by some as a vindication of the reverence paid to relics practiced in the Catholic and Orthodox churches. As John McEvilly notes, this is because Jesus, "far from condemning, as superstitious, the respect and reverence paid to the clothes which He wore, even directly sanctions it, by working miracles in approval of it."

See also
 Life of Jesus in the New Testament
 Ministry of Jesus
 Miracles of Jesus
 Parables of Jesus
 Christianity and fringed garments

References

Miracles of Jesus